Amirabad (also Romanized as Amīrābād; also known as Amīrābād-e Razan) is a village in Kharqan Rural District, in the Central District of Razan County, Hamadan Province, Iran. At the 2006 census, its population was 507, in 128 families.

References 

Populated places in Razan County